Xavier: Renegade Angel is an American adult computer-animated television series created by Vernon Chatman and John Lee, who are also the creators of Wonder Showzen. The show was produced by PFFR, with animation by Cinematico. It premiered on November 4, 2007, on Adult Swim and November 1, 2007, on the Adult Swim website.

Xavier features a style characterized by an elaborate and nonlinear plot following the humorous musings of an itinerant humanoid pseudo-shaman and spiritual seeker named Xavier. The show is known for its use of ideologically critical dark comedy as well as surrealist and absurdist humor presented through a psychedelic and satirically New Age lens.

Characters
 Xavier – A well-meaning yet naive and oblivious faun-like shaman wanderer with delusions of grandeur who speaks in a surfer accent. Xavier is the eponymous main character of the program, often shown to be a deeply insecure, self-righteous, and childlike individual who can quickly turn against others if interactions with them lead to negative feelings about himself. Xavier often brings total destruction to his environment and those around him in his attempts to right what he sees as wrong or help others with their problems, in many instances going as far as breaking reality itself. His physical appearance is equally absurd. He wears the shell of an isopod-like creature as an armband on his right arm. His left hand is a snake from the elbow downwards. It usually acts like an ordinary hand, but in the episodes "The 6th Teat of Good Intentions" and "El Tornadador", it appears to possess its own consciousness and speaks to Xavier directly. His knees bend at the joints backwards, he is covered in brown fur and has ocular heterochromia, having one brown eye and one blue. Instead of a nose, Xavier has a raptor-like beak, though he also has a mouth. He has six nipples and a giant eye in place of his genitalia. He typically wears tennis shoes and a loin cloth embroidered with varying symbols. Xavier's purpose seems to change slightly with each episode, with the initial plot setting him as a wandering philosopher, aspiring "wise man" or sage of sorts whose intent on hermitism seems to give references to Native American vision quests. Of initial importance seems to be Xavier's drawn-out search for an answer to the abstract question, "What doth life?" Later on in the series, however, the original plot seems to alter slightly into a more personal and less transcendent search: Xavier announces his reasons for roaming the world as the means to which he can help others, his purpose being to improve the quality of human existence and, generally speaking, do good. Much of the first season focuses on his search for the person who killed his father, himself, while the second season puts focus on his search for his mother, whom he believes to be alive after digging up her grave. In the series finale, he finds her in a lunatic asylum and has sex with her, which causes Xavier to see himself as the human he apparently always was.  When he says "I'm cured," his psychiatrist says "Cured? Who says there was anything wrong with you?"; it is then revealed that the psychiatrist looks and sounds like whatever creature Xavier saw himself as.
 Chief Master Guru – This supposedly Indigenous shaman took Xavier in after he became orphaned, and taught him mystical and spiritual practices (one such teaching being the power to heal others with the use of a fictional instrument called a "shakashuri"). The Shaman features frequently in flashbacks, and—despite Xavier's adulation—is shown to be abusive, sadistic, bullying and cruel. He eventually fakes his own death in order to get rid of Xavier, but it's later revealed that he gave Xavier the loin cloth and the inspiration to help people in order to get rid of him.
 Xavier's father – Being dead, Xavier's father only appears in flashbacks and visions. Xavier says he wants to avenge his father's death, but in one such flashback his father insists that Xavier himself killed him.  He asks the viewers to judge the contest in Episode 10. Xavier's father seems to have been far less neglectful and more genuinely loving than his mother. In a flashback, however, (one which Xavier later denies as being true), Xavier's father takes Xavier to a remote location and abandons him as a child, only leaving him with a bicycle as a means of compensation before crashing into a truck and exploding. 
 Xavier's mother – Xavier's mother is generally seen in flashbacks as constantly either drunk, drug-addled, or having sex with (often multiple) men or animals. In "Haunted Tonk", it is revealed that Xavier went back in time and told his younger self to give his mother only apple juice and sugar pills instead of alcohol and medication. Xavier's mother seems to have hated him for his appearances, calling him a "demon child", among other names. In "Braingeas Final Cranny", it is revealed that Xavier's mother tried to abort Xavier, though she found out that she was too far along into the pregnancy in order to do so. She instead allowed the  doctor to torture her child while inside her womb with a cattle prod. In several episodes, Xavier is shown searching the world for his lost mother.
 Computer – Computer is a sentient computer used by Xavier for analysis and information. He appears as a jerkily edited live-action actor set in front of a jarring black-and-white background. He is played by John Flansburgh, half of the band They Might Be Giants.

Creation and content
The computer-generated animation-style of Xavier: Renegade Angel resembles that of PC games such as Second Life and The Sims. The show features ribald wordplay, nonchalant violence and transgressive sexuality, in deeply nested, often recursive plots. These plots are often very nonlinear in their chronology; however, each episode seems to contain similar themes and motifs, as well as a single opening scene that has recurred in every episode of Xavier: a depiction of the titular character wandering through a desert (likely a satirical take on the "wandering in the desert" archetype as a search for wisdom) as he narrates a semi-spontaneous, often nonsensical philosophical thought that many times connects with the episode at hand, whilst the title card of the show itself flies overhead, usually varying in action or position. An opening theme presumed to be played by Xavier on his "shakashuri" is present during these.

Co-creator Vernon Chatman called the show "a warning to children and adults about the dangers of spirituality". The show has been known to show insensitivity and caricatures of Catholicism, Islam, Middle America, redneck stereotypes, and anarcho-punk subcultures.

Xavier often incorporates underlying themes and concepts based outside of, though interconnected with, the plot of each episode. Philosophical or political concepts are often juxtaposed with the surrealistic and aleatory nature of the show. Society and cultural psychology and phenomena, the meaning of life, the existence of sentience and the nature of reality have been examined in one form or another throughout the program's 2 seasons.

Jokes and humor tend to be oriented towards Xavier's own philosophical inquiry and the "deep," "zen-like" diction of wisdom quotes from various spiritual systems (particularly Native American and Hindu or Eastern spirituality) that Xavier seemingly attempts to mimic. These are many times lightly mocked with Xavier's misuse of the phrases, reflecting on contemporary humor and taking the often circular logic of such statements far out of context.

Taboo topics — such as necrophilia, bestiality, homophobia, abortion, irreligion, pedophilia, incest, self-injury, transphobia, and racism — are used as sources for humor. In this respect, the program can be seen as containing a substantial amount of black comedy.

Episodes

Season 1 (2007–08)

Season 2 (2009)

International broadcast
In Canada, Xavier: Renegade Angel previously aired on Teletoon's Teletoon at Night block and later G4's Adult Digital Distraction block. The series currently airs in Canada on the Canadian version of Adult Swim.

Home media
Adult Swim released the series on DVD in America on November 10, 2009, shortly after the series finale originally aired. Madman Entertainment released the series on DVD on Region 4 in Australia on February 10, 2010. In addition to being available on DVD, the entire series is also available on iTunes.

Reception 

In 2009, DVD Talk'''s Casey Burchby gave the show three and half stars out of five, noting "Xavier: Renegade Angel is intelligent, entertaining, and very funny. It is also consistent to a fault. The show never develops much beyond its original concept and falls into a repetitious rut. [...] Much like Flight of the Conchords, its small triumphs are better appreciated over time; a concentrated dose of the show reveals its flaws."Xavier: Renegade Angel was largely ignored on initial release, but garnered a cult following and by 2017 it was highly regarded for its originality, absurd imagery and smart, intricate humor. In that year, Inverse.com placed Xavier 15th on a list of "The 25 Most Iconic Adult Swim Characters of All Time". Also in 2017, Max Carpenter of Vulture said that it "stands out as a puzzlement of form with its Second Life graphical environs and sphinxlike protagonist [...] Even in the context of PFFR’s twisted endeavors, the show's blend of form and content is a brilliant anomaly. [...] Xavier is on one level a comedy-by-assault, an explosion of wordplay, and a ridiculousness of images that the average viewer can only take in piecemeal." Lionel Boyce, co-creator of The Jellies!'', listed it among his favorite cartoons.

2020 short
In 2020, Xavier returned to give a virtual commencement speech, as part of Adult Swim's Commencement Speaker Series 2020, a response to the cancellation of commencement ceremonies due to the COVID-19 pandemic. Vernon Chatman returned to voice Xavier as part of a six-minute video that was released on YouTube and the Adult Swim app.

References

External links

Make Your Own Xavier Contest (Archived)

2000s American adult animated television series
2007 American television series debuts
2009 American television series endings
Adult Swim original programming
American adult computer-animated television series
American adult animated comedy television series
English-language television shows
Existentialist television series
Television series by PFFR
Television series by Williams Street